Sean Hill is an American writer well known for his Twitter feed @veryshortstories, where he posts flash fiction. A print collection of this feed, Very Short Stories: 300 Bite-Size Works of Fiction, was published in 2012.

References

Living people
American male writers
Year of birth missing (living people)
Place of birth missing (living people)